Zeta Caeli, Latinized from ζ Caeli, is an orange-hued star in the constellation Caelum with a visual magnitude of +6.36. It is an evolved K-type giant star and a member of the Milky Way's thick disk population. Based upon an annual parallax shift of 7.59 mas as seen from Earth, this star is located about 430 light years from the Sun.

References

External links
 HR 1539
 Image Zeta Caeli

K-type giants
Caeli, Zeta
Caelum
Durchmusterung objects
030608
022280
1539